Jerry Turner may refer to:

 Jerry Turner (theater director) (1927–2004), artistic director of the Oregon Shakespeare Festival, 1971–1991
 Jerry Turner (anchorman) (1929–1987), American television news anchorman
 Jerry Turner (American football) (born 1978), arena football player
 Jerry Turner (baseball) (born 1954), former Major League Baseball outfielder
 Jerry Turner (politician) (born 1941), American politician in Mississippi

See also
Gerry Turner (1921–1982), children's author
Gerald Turner, academic administrator
Jeremy Turner (disambiguation)